Pikuzy, also called Kominternove, is a village in Mariupol Raion (district) in Donetsk Oblast of eastern Ukraine, at about 23 km ENE from Mariupol and at about the same distance WNW from Novoazovsk.

The War in Donbass has brought along both civilian and military casualties. As of 15 October 2015 the village was reportedly in a so-called "grey zone". But since 22 December 2015 it is controlled by the self-proclaimed Donetsk People's Republic. On 1 October 2017 residents of Pikuzy gave the observers of the OSCE mission in Ukraine a letter also addressed to the United Nations and the Red Cross requesting for the immediate withdrawal of armed men and of weapons from residential areas of the village.

Demographics
Native language as of the Ukrainian Census of 2001:
Ukrainian 30.20%
Russian 69.14%
Bulgarian 0.33%

References

Villages in Mariupol Raion